Carlos Alberto Orejuela Pita (born 4 April 1980, in Lima), known as Carlos Orejuela, is a Peruvian footballer who plays as a striker for Cienciano in the Peruvian Primera División.

Orejuela made seven appearances for the Peru national football team from 2003 to 2004.

Career
In March 2020, Orejuela joined Chavelines Juniors.

References

External links

1980 births
Living people
Footballers from Lima
Association football forwards
Peruvian footballers
Peru international footballers
Club Universitario de Deportes footballers
Sport Boys footballers
Cienciano footballers
Sporting Cristal footballers
Club Alianza Lima footballers
Club Deportivo Universidad César Vallejo footballers
Total Chalaco footballers
León de Huánuco footballers
Ayacucho FC footballers
Real Garcilaso footballers
Peruvian Primera División players
Peruvian Segunda División players